The Convention on the High Seas is an international treaty which codifies the rules of international law relating to the high seas, otherwise known as international waters. The convention was one of four treaties created at the United Nations Convention on the Law of the Sea (UNCLOS I). The four treaties were signed on 29 April 1958 and entered into force on 30 September 1962, although in keeping with legal tradition, later accession was permitted.

As of 2013, the treaty had been ratified by 63 states, including most NATO-bloc and Soviet-bloc nations but with the notable exceptions of most of the OPEC and Arab league nations like Syria, Egypt, Jordan, Saudi Arabia, and Iran, as well as China, North Korea, and South Korea.

The convention on the High Seas was superseded by the 1982 UNCLOS III, which introduced several new concepts to the law of maritime boundaries including Exclusive Economic Zones.

Provisions 

The treaty is divided into 37 articles:

Article 1: Definition of "high seas".
Article 2: Statement of principles
Article 3: Access to the sea for landlocked states
Articles 4–7: the concept of a Flag State
Article 8: Warships
Article 9: Other ships in government service
Articles 10–12: Safety, rescue
Article 13: Outlawing transport of slaves at sea
Articles 14–21: Piracy
Article 22: Boarding of merchant ships by warships
Article 23: Hot pursuit, that is, pursuit of a vessel across borders for the purposes of law enforcement
Articles 24–25: Pollution
Articles 26–29: Submarine cables and pipelines
Articles 30–37: legal framework, ratification, accession

References

1962 in the environment
Law of the sea treaties
United Nations treaties
Treaties concluded in 1958
Treaties entered into force in 1962
Treaties of the Kingdom of Afghanistan
Treaties of the People's Socialist Republic of Albania
Treaties of Australia
Treaties of Austria
Treaties of the Byelorussian Soviet Socialist Republic
Treaties of Belgium
Treaties of Bosnia and Herzegovina
Treaties of the People's Republic of Bulgaria
Treaties of Burkina Faso
Treaties of the Kingdom of Cambodia (1953–1970)
Treaties of the Central African Republic
Treaties of Costa Rica
Treaties of Croatia
Treaties of Cyprus
Treaties of the Czech Republic
Treaties of Czechoslovakia
Treaties of Denmark
Treaties of the Dominican Republic
Treaties of Fiji
Treaties of Finland
Treaties of East Germany
Treaties of West Germany
Treaties of Guatemala
Treaties of Haiti
Treaties of the Hungarian People's Republic
Treaties of Indonesia
Treaties of Israel
Treaties of Italy
Treaties of Jamaica
Treaties of Japan
Treaties of Kenya
Treaties of Latvia
Treaties of Lesotho
Treaties of Madagascar
Treaties of Malawi
Treaties of Malaysia
Treaties of Mauritius
Treaties of Mexico
Treaties of the Mongolian People's Republic
Treaties of Montenegro
Treaties of Nepal
Treaties of the Netherlands
Treaties of Nigeria
Treaties of the Polish People's Republic
Treaties of the Estado Novo (Portugal)
Treaties of the Socialist Republic of Romania
Treaties of the Soviet Union
Treaties of Senegal
Treaties of Serbia and Montenegro
Treaties of Slovakia
Treaties of Slovenia
Treaties of the Solomon Islands
Treaties of Sierra Leone
Treaties of South Africa
Treaties of Francoist Spain
Treaties of Eswatini
Treaties of Switzerland
Treaties of Thailand
Treaties of Tonga
Treaties of Trinidad and Tobago
Treaties of Uganda
Treaties of the Ukrainian Soviet Socialist Republic
Treaties of the United Kingdom
Treaties of the United States
Treaties of Venezuela
Treaties of Yugoslavia
1958 in Switzerland
Treaties extended to the Netherlands Antilles
Treaties extended to Aruba
Treaties extended to Greenland
Treaties extended to the Faroe Islands
Treaties extended to Surinam (Dutch colony)
Treaties extended to West Berlin